The 1942 RPI Engineers men's soccer team represented the Rensselaer Polytechnic Institute during the 1942 ISFA season. The team finished with a 5–0–2 record, their first undefeated season since 1922.

Due to World War II, the Intercollegiate Soccer Football Association (ISFA) and National Soccer Coaches Association of America (NSCAA) did not award a formal champion. The 1942 Engineers team was retroactively named the national soccer co-champion by the American Soccer History Archives, along with Princeton, Springfield, and UMass.

Schedule 

|-
!colspan=6 style=""| Matches
|-

References 

Rpi
Rpi
Intercollegiate Soccer Football Association Championship-winning seasons